Millrift is an unincorporated community located in Westfall Township in Pike County, Pennsylvania, United States. Millrift is located at the intersection of Delaware Drive and Bluestone Boulevard on the west bank of the Delaware River, northwest of Matamoras. The first settler in Millrift was James Sawyer, who moved his family from Orange County, New York. The location was where Bushkill Creek meets the Delaware River, and eventually became known as Saw-Mill Rift. The Erie Railroad established a crossover for passing trains at the location and nicknamed it Turnover. The United States Postal Service opened a station there in 1884 under the current name of Mill Rift.

References

Unincorporated communities in Pike County, Pennsylvania
Unincorporated communities in Pennsylvania